The discography of New Zealand singer Sharon O'Neill consists of six studio albums, one live album and four compilations.

Albums

Studio albums

Live albums

Compilation albums

Box set

Extended plays

Singles

Other singles 

MUSIC VIDEOS

 "Words" (1979)
 "Don't Let Love Go" (1980)
 "How Do You Talk To Boys" (1980)
 "Asian Paradise" (1980)
 "Waiting For You" (1981)
 "Maybe" (1981)
 "For All The Tea In China" (1982)
 "Losing You" (1983)
 "Maxine" (1983)
 "Danger" (1983)
 "Power" (1984)
 "The Garden" (1985)
 "Physical Favours" (1987)
 "Danced In The Fire" (1988)
 "Satin Sheets" (1990)

References

Discographies of New Zealand artists
Pop music discographies
Rhythm and blues discographies